The Tapp Room is a Canadian variety television series which aired on CBC Television from 1956 to 1958.

Premise
This Montreal-produced series was named for host Jimmy Tapp who hosted popular music artists who were visiting the city. Episodes also included segments such as songs and an early 1957 "Name the Chimp" competition.

Scheduling
This half-hour series was broadcast on Mondays at 11:30 p.m. from 14 May 1956 to 20 September 1958.

References

External links
 

CBC Television original programming
1956 Canadian television series debuts
1958 Canadian television series endings
1950s Canadian variety television series
Black-and-white Canadian television shows